Girls and Weather is the debut album from the Devon-based band The Rumble Strips. It was released on September 10, 2007 by the Island Records sub-label Fallout Records.

AllMusic reviewer Katherine Fulton said that "happy melodies coupled with bittersweet lyrics are a running theme throughout the album", being quick to note this is a good thing because "it's a formula that works well for the Rumble Strips." She sums up the album by saying it "loses neither steam nor charm throughout; it's an album for adults who want an excuse to behave like kids again." NME reviewer Jamie Fullerton focuses in particular on the frontman, indicating that the "cheesy, into-the-sunset fantasy is just another indication of Waller's total detachment from the current grot-rock set, just as he's detached from the cretins who brand him a Dexy's photocopier."

Track listing
 "No Soul" - 2:44
 "Alarm Clock" - 3:13
 "Building a Boat" - 2:38
 "Girls and Boys in Love" - 2:33
 "Oh Creole" - 3:15
 "Motorcycle" - 3:56
 "Time" - 3:32
 "Clouds" - 3:37
 "Don't Dumb Down" - 2:53
 "Cowboy" - 2:39
 "Hate Me (You Do)" - 3:13
 "Hands" - 3:32
 "Girls and Weather" - 3:44 (Japanese Edition Bonus Track)
 "The Boys Are Back in Town" - 4:07 (Japanese Edition Bonus Track)
 "Girls and Boys in Love (Hot Chip Remix)" - 3:45 (Japanese Edition Bonus Track)

Personnel

Band
 Charles Waller - guitar, vocals
 Henry Clark - trumpet, vocals, piano
 Tom Gorbutt - saxophone, vocals, bass
 Matthew Wheeler - drums

Production
 Todd Burke, Jason Gossman - engineers
 Jonathan de Villiers - photography
 Duncan Ellis - management
 Tappin Gofton - art direction, design
 Tony Hoffer - music producer, engineer, mixing
 Stephen Marcussen - mastering

References

2007 debut albums
The Rumble Strips albums
Island Records albums
Albums produced by Tony Hoffer